Sepsi may refer to:

László Sepsi (born 1986), Romanian footballer of Hungarian descent
Sepsi-78, a football club from Seinäjoki, Finland
ACS Sepsi SIC, a women's basketball club from Sfântu Gheorghe, Romania
Sepsi OSK, a football club from Sfântu Gheorghe, Romania